Paul K. Chu (朱劍豪) is a specialist in plasma surface modification and materials science. He is Chair Professor of Materials Engineering in the Department of Physics, Department of Materials Science & Engineering, and Department of Biomedical Engineering at City University of Hong Kong.

Biography
He received his BS in mathematics (cum laude) from the Ohio State University in 1977 and MS and PhD in chemistry from Cornell University in 1979 and 1982, respectively.

He is Fellow of the American Physical Society (APS), American Vacuum Society (AVS), Institute of Electrical and Electronics Engineers (IEEE), and Materials Research Society (MRS).  He has received more than 20 research / technical awards including the IEEE Nuclear and Plasma Sciences (NPSS) Merit Award in 2007, MRS (Taiwan) JW Mayer Lectureship in 2008, Shanghai (China) Natural Science First Class Award 中國上海自然科學一等獎 in 2011, Chinese Ministry of Education Natural Science First Class Award 中國教育部自然科學一等獎 in 2017, Hubei Province (China) Natural Science Second Class Award 中國湖北省自然科學二等獎 in 2018, and Anhui Province (China) Science and Technology Third Class Award 中國安徽省科學技術三等獎 in 2020. He was awarded Leading Talents of Guangdong Province of China (中國廣東省領軍人才) and Thousand Talents of China (中國國家千人).  He is a highly cited researcher in materials science / cross-field according to Web of Science / Clarivate Analytics.

He is Fellow and Council Member of the Hong Kong Academy of Engineering Sciences (HKAES) (香港工程科學院院士) and Fellow of Hong Kong Institution of Engineers (HKIE).

He is Chairman of the International Plasma-Based Ion Implantation Executive Committee which organizes the biennial International Workshop on Plasma-Based Ion Implantation and Deposition (PBII&D) and a member of the Ion Implantation Technology (IIT) International Committee that organizes the biennial International Conference on Ion Implantation Technology.

He holds or has held honorary/visiting professorships in 17 universities and research institutes in China, including Peking University, Fudan University, Nanjing University, Shanghai Jiaotong University, Xi'an Jiaotong University, Harbin Institute of Technology, and Chinese Academy of Sciences.

He is supervising senior editor of IEEE Transactions on Plasma Science, associate editor of Materials Science and Engineering: R: Reports, as well as an editorial board member of Biomaterials, Advanced Materials Interfaces, Surface & Coatings Technology, Journal of Vacuum Science and Technology A & B, Surface and Interface Analysis, International Journal of Molecular Engineering, and Cancer Nanotechnology.

Publications
He has authored / co-authored more than 2,000 journal papers and given more than 150 plenary, keynote, and invited talks in international scientific conferences.  He is co-author of one book, co-editor of eight books, and co-author of more than 40 book chapters on plasma science and engineering, advanced materials, and nanotechnology.  He has received 15 best paper awards.

Patents
He has been granted more than 30 patents.

External links
Personal website
Plasma Laboratory website
ORCID
CityU Scholars
Google Scholar
Web of Science ResearcherID
Scopus

Cornell University alumni
Fellow Members of the IEEE
Academic staff of the City University of Hong Kong
Living people
Year of birth missing (living people)
Fellows of the American Physical Society